The Dauphin Island Bridge, formally the Gordon Persons Bridge, carries a , two-lane section of Alabama State Route 193 from mainland Mobile County, Alabama across the Gulf Intracoastal Waterway to Dauphin Island. The natural channel followed by the Gulf Intracoastal Waterway at this location is Pass Aux Herons.  The bridge separates the Mississippi Sound on the west from Mobile Bay on the east.  It was named in honor of Seth Gordon Persons, the 46th governor of Alabama.

History
The original bridge opened on July 2, 1955.  It was destroyed by Hurricane Frederic in 1979 and was replaced by a fixed precast concrete segmental bridge in 1982.  The central main span was the first use of a  span on a precast concrete segmental bridge.

On January 7, 2008, Vietnamese immigrant Lam Luong tossed four children, including three of his own, to their deaths off of the bridge. In March 2009, a jury in Mobile County convicted him of capital murder for the act. He was sentenced to death on April 30, 2009. His death sentence was reduced to life without parole on October 15, 2018, as it was ruled he was intellectually impaired and had an IQ too low for execution.

References

External links
 Jeff Coolidge
 Figg Engineering
 Dauphin Island celebrates 50 history changing years
 Google map of bridge
 Nautical chart of bridge area

Bridges in Mobile County, Alabama
Gulf of Mexico
Bridges completed in 1955
Bridges completed in 1982
Road bridges in Alabama
1955 establishments in Alabama
Concrete bridges in the United States